Donatas Sabeckis (born 30 December 1992) is a Lithuanian professional basketball player for BC Šiauliai of the Lithuanian Basketball League (LKL). He primarily plays as point guard, but can also play as shooting guard or small forward.

Playing career
Born in Kaunas, Sabeckis started his professional career in JAZZ-Diremta, where he played in RKL and NKL leagues (third and second division).
In 2013/2014 season he moved to Sūduva-Mantinga alongside his brother Deividas. In 2015/16 season Sabeckis won gold medals with the team and was named NKL Finals MVP.

In 2016/17 season he signed with Šiauliai of the LKL. On 23 April 2017 in game against BC Vytautas, Sabeckis recorded 20 points, 13 assists, 7 rebounds, 6 steals, and 37 efficiency points.

After a breakout 2017/2018 season, in which Sabeckis led LKL in assists, he was signed by Žalgiris on August 6, 2018. On October 31, Sabeckis was loaned to German club MHP Riesen Ludwigsburg for the rest of the season. After a tumultuous year plagued with roster changes, and being out with an injury for almost three months, Sabeckis left the team on June 3, 2019, along with three more players.

On July 21, 2019, he parted ways with Žalgiris and signed with Croatian club Cibona.

During season 2020-2021, he signed a 1 year contract with @Lions de Genève, a Swiss professional club in 1st division (SBL League). He won two national titles during this season the SBL Cup and the Patrick Baumann Swiss Cup. 

On July 24, 2021, Sabeckis signed two–year contract with BC Šiauliai

References

External links
Donatas Sabeckis at euroleague.net
Donatas Sabeckis at RealGM.com

1992 births
Living people
Basketball players from Kaunas
BC Prienai players
BC Šiauliai players
BC Žalgiris players
Guards (basketball)
KK Cibona players
Lithuanian expatriate basketball people
Lithuanian expatriate sportspeople in Switzerland
Lithuanian men's basketball players
Riesen Ludwigsburg players